The 2019–20 season is PAS Giannina F.C.'s 27th competitive season in the second division of Greek football, 1st season in the Super League Greece 2, and 54th year in existence as a football club. They also compete in the Greek Cup.

PAS Giannina was first when the championship was suspended. On 22 June 2020 it was announced that the ranking on 12 March 2020 is the final ranking. PAS Giannina was promoted to Super League Greece.

Players 
updated 20/1/20

International players

Foreign players

Personnel

Management

Coaching staff

medical staff

Academy

Transfers

Summer

In

Out 

For recent transfers, see List of Greek football transfers summer 2019.

Winter

Out 

For recent transfers, see List of Greek football transfers winter 2019–20.

Alternative

Pre-season and friendlies

Competitions

Super League 2

League table

Results summary

Fixtures 
   
Match not held due to the COVID-19 pandemic.

Greek Cup 

PAS Giannina will enter the Greek Cup at the fourth round.

Fourth round

Fifth round

Round of 16

Statistics

Appearances

Goalscorers

Clean sheets

References

External links 

 Official Website

PAS Giannina F.C. seasons
PAS Giannina